The 1948 VFL season was the 52nd season of the Victorian Football League (VFL), the highest level senior Australian rules football competition in Victoria. The season featured twelve clubs, ran from 17 April until 9 October, and comprised a 19-game home-and-away season followed by a finals series featuring the top four clubs.

The premiership was won by the Melbourne Football Club for the sixth time, after it defeated  by 39 points in the 1948 VFL Grand Final Replay.

Premiership season
In 1948, the VFL competition consisted of twelve teams of 18 on-the-field players each, plus two substitute players, known as the 19th man and the 20th man. A player could be substituted for any reason; however, once substituted, a player could not return to the field of play under any circumstances.

Teams played each other in a home-and-away season of 19 rounds; matches 12 to 19 were the "home-and-way reverse" of matches 1 to 8.

Once the 19 round home-and-away season had finished, the 1948 VFL Premiers were determined by the specific format and conventions of the Page–McIntyre system.

Round 1

|- bgcolor="#CCCCFF"
| Home team
| Home team score
| Away team
| Away team score
| Venue
| Crowd
| Date
|- bgcolor="#FFFFFF"
| 
| 21.19 (145)
| 
| 9.11 (65)
| Western Oval
| 14,000
| 17 April 1948
|- bgcolor="#FFFFFF"
| 
| 13.14 (92)
| 
| 9.16 (70)
| Brunswick Street Oval
| 17,000
| 17 April 1948
|- bgcolor="#FFFFFF"
| 
| 18.15 (123)
| 
| 17.6 (108)
| Lake Oval
| 28,000
| 17 April 1948
|- bgcolor="#FFFFFF"
| 
| 12.5 (77)
| 
| 13.18 (96)
| MCG
| 29,000
| 17 April 1948
|- bgcolor="#FFFFFF"
| 
| 9.12 (66)
| 
| 11.20 (86)
| Arden Street Oval
| 20,000
| 17 April 1948
|- bgcolor="#FFFFFF"
| 
| 11.10 (76)
| 
| 17.15 (117)
| Glenferrie Oval
| 16,000
| 17 April 1948

Round 2

|- bgcolor="#CCCCFF"
| Home team
| Home team score
| Away team
| Away team score
| Venue
| Crowd
| Date
|- bgcolor="#FFFFFF"
| 
| 15.17 (107)
| 
| 10.8 (68)
| Kardinia Park
| 17,500
| 24 April 1948
|- bgcolor="#FFFFFF"
| 
| 8.10 (58)
| 
| 10.18 (78)
| Princes Park
| 32,000
| 24 April 1948
|- bgcolor="#FFFFFF"
| 
| 7.6 (48)
| 
| 11.13 (79)
| Junction Oval
| 9,000
| 24 April 1948
|- bgcolor="#FFFFFF"
| 
| 20.12 (132)
| 
| 8.9 (57)
| Punt Road Oval
| 29,000
| 24 April 1948
|- bgcolor="#FFFFFF"
| 
| 11.16 (82)
| 
| 8.11 (59)
| Windy Hill
| 16,000
| 26 April 1948
|- bgcolor="#FFFFFF"
| 
| 18.17 (125)
| 
| 10.12 (72)
| Victoria Park
| 47,000
| 26 April 1948

Round 3

|- bgcolor="#CCCCFF"
| Home team
| Home team score
| Away team
| Away team score
| Venue
| Crowd
| Date
|- bgcolor="#FFFFFF"
| 
| 10.11 (71)
| 
| 13.16 (94)
| Arden Street Oval
| 19,000
| 1 May 1948
|- bgcolor="#FFFFFF"
| 
| 12.12 (84)
| 
| 6.9 (45)
| Western Oval
| 13,000
| 1 May 1948
|- bgcolor="#FFFFFF"
| 
| 11.12 (78)
| 
| 15.16 (106)
| Junction Oval
| 14,000
| 1 May 1948
|- bgcolor="#FFFFFF"
| 
| 6.12 (48)
| 
| 12.14 (86)
| MCG
| 31,000
| 1 May 1948
|- bgcolor="#FFFFFF"
| 
| 16.12 (108)
| 
| 14.9 (93)
| Windy Hill
| 30,000
| 1 May 1948
|- bgcolor="#FFFFFF"
| 
| 12.15 (87)
| 
| 13.11 (89)
| Kardinia Park
| 23,000
| 1 May 1948

Round 4

|- bgcolor="#CCCCFF"
| Home team
| Home team score
| Away team
| Away team score
| Venue
| Crowd
| Date
|- bgcolor="#FFFFFF"
| 
| 14.21 (105)
| 
| 11.15 (81)
| Glenferrie Oval
| 9,000
| 8 May 1948
|- bgcolor="#FFFFFF"
| 
| 19.14 (128)
| 
| 6.8 (44)
| Brunswick Street Oval
| 10,000
| 8 May 1948
|- bgcolor="#FFFFFF"
| 
| 18.13 (121)
| 
| 13.10 (88)
| Victoria Park
| 18,000
| 8 May 1948
|- bgcolor="#FFFFFF"
| 
| 12.24 (96)
| 
| 15.8 (98)
| Princes Park
| 19,000
| 8 May 1948
|- bgcolor="#FFFFFF"
| 
| 12.12 (84)
| 
| 13.11 (89)
| Punt Road Oval
| 19,000
| 8 May 1948
|- bgcolor="#FFFFFF"
| 
| 11.12 (78)
| 
| 20.20 (140)
| Lake Oval
| 20,000
| 8 May 1948

Round 5

|- bgcolor="#CCCCFF"
| Home team
| Home team score
| Away team
| Away team score
| Venue
| Crowd
| Date
|- bgcolor="#FFFFFF"
| 
| 12.12 (84)
| 
| 14.23 (107)
| Junction Oval
| 10,000
| 15 May 1948
|- bgcolor="#FFFFFF"
| 
| 14.11 (95)
| 
| 6.14 (50)
| MCG
| 13,000
| 15 May 1948
|- bgcolor="#FFFFFF"
| 
| 15.19 (109)
| 
| 6.11 (47)
| Brunswick Street Oval
| 8,500
| 15 May 1948
|- bgcolor="#FFFFFF"
| 
| 13.17 (95)
| 
| 14.11 (95)
| Windy Hill
| 23,000
| 15 May 1948
|- bgcolor="#FFFFFF"
| 
| 11.13 (79)
| 
| 8.10 (58)
| Kardinia Park
| 17,500
| 15 May 1948
|- bgcolor="#FFFFFF"
| 
| 8.17 (65)
| 
| 9.9 (63)
| Victoria Park
| 31,000
| 15 May 1948

Round 6

|- bgcolor="#CCCCFF"
| Home team
| Home team score
| Away team
| Away team score
| Venue
| Crowd
| Date
|- bgcolor="#FFFFFF"
| 
| 12.16 (88)
| 
| 9.10 (64)
| Arden Street Oval
| 7,000
| 22 May 1948
|- bgcolor="#FFFFFF"
| 
| 14.9 (93)
| 
| 19.7 (121)
| Princes Park
| 25,000
| 22 May 1948
|- bgcolor="#FFFFFF"
| 
| 9.5 (59)
| 
| 15.15 (105)
| Lake Oval
| 17,500
| 22 May 1948
|- bgcolor="#FFFFFF"
| 
| 17.10 (112)
| 
| 12.3 (75)
| Glenferrie Oval
| 9,500
| 22 May 1948
|- bgcolor="#FFFFFF"
| 
| 10.11 (71)
| 
| 9.10 (64)
| Western Oval
| 18,000
| 22 May 1948
|- bgcolor="#FFFFFF"
| 
| 21.14 (140)
| 
| 9.21 (75)
| Punt Road Oval
| 33,000
| 22 May 1948

Round 7

|- bgcolor="#CCCCFF"
| Home team
| Home team score
| Away team
| Away team score
| Venue
| Crowd
| Date
|- bgcolor="#FFFFFF"
| 
| 9.11 (65)
| 
| 12.14 (86)
| Glenferrie Oval
| 17,000
| 29 May 1948
|- bgcolor="#FFFFFF"
| 
| 8.12 (60)
| 
| 3.10 (28)
| Western Oval
| 17,000
| 29 May 1948
|- bgcolor="#FFFFFF"
| 
| 9.20 (74)
| 
| 7.8 (50)
| Brunswick Street Oval
| 12,000
| 29 May 1948
|- bgcolor="#FFFFFF"
| 
| 12.11 (83)
| 
| 14.15 (99)
| Windy Hill
| 13,000
| 29 May 1948
|- bgcolor="#FFFFFF"
| 
| 4.12 (36)
| 
| 10.18 (78)
| Junction Oval
| 11,000
| 29 May 1948
|- bgcolor="#FFFFFF"
| 
| 15.12 (102)
| 
| 7.9 (51)
| MCG
| 35,000
| 29 May 1948

Round 8

|- bgcolor="#CCCCFF"
| Home team
| Home team score
| Away team
| Away team score
| Venue
| Crowd
| Date
|- bgcolor="#FFFFFF"
| 
| 15.16 (106)
| 
| 19.12 (126)
| Kardinia Park
| 19,500
| 5 June 1948
|- bgcolor="#FFFFFF"
| 
| 11.17 (83)
| 
| 11.10 (76)
| Victoria Park
| 20,000
| 5 June 1948
|- bgcolor="#FFFFFF"
| 
| 7.12 (54)
| 
| 10.12 (72)
| Junction Oval
| 7,000
| 5 June 1948
|- bgcolor="#FFFFFF"
| 
| 11.6 (72)
| 
| 8.9 (57)
| Arden Street Oval
| 12,000
| 5 June 1948
|- bgcolor="#FFFFFF"
| 
| 12.8 (80)
| 
| 9.10 (64)
| Brunswick Street Oval
| 25,000
| 5 June 1948
|- bgcolor="#FFFFFF"
| 
| 13.10 (88)
| 
| 9.21 (75)
| Punt Road Oval
| 33,000
| 5 June 1948

Round 9

|- bgcolor="#CCCCFF"
| Home team
| Home team score
| Away team
| Away team score
| Venue
| Crowd
| Date
|- bgcolor="#FFFFFF"
| 
| 12.14 (86)
| 
| 4.8 (32)
| Windy Hill
| 17,000
| 12 June 1948
|- bgcolor="#FFFFFF"
| 
| 9.12 (66)
| 
| 15.11 (101)
| Lake Oval
| 33,000
| 12 June 1948
|- bgcolor="#FFFFFF"
| 
| 8.8 (56)
| 
| 12.27 (99)
| Glenferrie Oval
| 18,000
| 12 June 1948
|- bgcolor="#FFFFFF"
| 
| 11.9 (75)
| 
| 9.14 (68)
| Western Oval
| 20,000
| 14 June 1948
|- bgcolor="#FFFFFF"
| 
| 12.11 (83)
| 
| 7.18 (60)
| Princes Park
| 11,000
| 14 June 1948
|- bgcolor="#FFFFFF"
| 
| 15.14 (104)
| 
| 14.19 (103)
| Punt Road Oval
| 28,000
| 14 June 1948

Round 10

|- bgcolor="#CCCCFF"
| Home team
| Home team score
| Away team
| Away team score
| Venue
| Crowd
| Date
|- bgcolor="#FFFFFF"
| 
| 14.6 (90)
| 
| 9.16 (70)
| Arden Street Oval
| 12,000
| 19 June 1948
|- bgcolor="#FFFFFF"
| 
| 21.13 (139)
| 
| 9.9 (63)
| Kardinia Park
| 12,300
| 19 June 1948
|- bgcolor="#FFFFFF"
| 
| 18.12 (120)
| 
| 4.14 (38)
| Windy Hill
| 22,000
| 19 June 1948
|- bgcolor="#FFFFFF"
| 
| 15.12 (102)
| 
| 13.7 (85)
| Victoria Park
| 38,000
| 19 June 1948
|- bgcolor="#FFFFFF"
| 
| 18.12 (120)
| 
| 11.13 (79)
| MCG
| 12,200
| 19 June 1948
|- bgcolor="#FFFFFF"
| 
| 13.9 (87)
| 
| 23.11 (149)
| Lake Oval
| 24,000
| 19 June 1948

Round 11

|- bgcolor="#CCCCFF"
| Home team
| Home team score
| Away team
| Away team score
| Venue
| Crowd
| Date
|- bgcolor="#FFFFFF"
| 
| 9.7 (61)
| 
| 12.15 (87)
| Glenferrie Oval
| 8,000
| 3 July 1948
|- bgcolor="#FFFFFF"
| 
| 19.20 (134)
| 
| 14.11 (95)
| Brunswick Street Oval
| 25,000
| 3 July 1948
|- bgcolor="#FFFFFF"
| 
| 10.23 (83)
| 
| 14.10 (94)
| Princes Park
| 13,500
| 3 July 1948
|- bgcolor="#FFFFFF"
| 
| 9.17 (71)
| 
| 8.9 (57)
| MCG
| 16,000
| 3 July 1948
|- bgcolor="#FFFFFF"
| 
| 11.6 (72)
| 
| 17.22 (124)
| Junction Oval
| 6,000
| 3 July 1948
|- bgcolor="#FFFFFF"
| 
| 10.11 (71)
| 
| 19.9 (123)
| Western Oval
| 19,000
| 3 July 1948

Round 12

|- bgcolor="#CCCCFF"
| Home team
| Home team score
| Away team
| Away team score
| Venue
| Crowd
| Date
|- bgcolor="#FFFFFF"
| 
| 21.18 (144)
| 
| 9.13 (67)
| Punt Road Oval
| 21,000
| 10 July 1948
|- bgcolor="#FFFFFF"
| 
| 13.13 (91)
| 
| 9.11 (65)
| Windy Hill
| 17,000
| 10 July 1948
|- bgcolor="#FFFFFF"
| 
| 19.13 (127)
| 
| 10.11 (71)
| Victoria Park
| 19,500
| 10 July 1948
|- bgcolor="#FFFFFF"
| 
| 17.10 (112)
| 
| 10.9 (69)
| Princes Park
| 9,000
| 10 July 1948
|- bgcolor="#FFFFFF"
| 
| 7.11 (53)
| 
| 13.13 (91)
| Junction Oval
| 7,000
| 10 July 1948
|- bgcolor="#FFFFFF"
| 
| 13.9 (87)
| 
| 9.17 (71)
| Kardinia Park
| 18,500
| 10 July 1948

Round 13

|- bgcolor="#CCCCFF"
| Home team
| Home team score
| Away team
| Away team score
| Venue
| Crowd
| Date
|- bgcolor="#FFFFFF"
| 
| 24.19 (163)
| 
| 8.10 (58)
| MCG
| 10,000
| 17 July 1948
|- bgcolor="#FFFFFF"
| 
| 10.14 (74)
| 
| 12.9 (81)
| Western Oval
| 20,000
| 17 July 1948
|- bgcolor="#FFFFFF"
| 
| 10.8 (68)
| 
| 10.15 (75)
| Arden Street Oval
| 12,000
| 17 July 1948
|- bgcolor="#FFFFFF"
| 
| 9.12 (66)
| 
| 18.14 (122)
| Glenferrie Oval
| 12,000
| 17 July 1948
|- bgcolor="#FFFFFF"
| 
| 10.12 (72)
| 
| 13.16 (94)
| Lake Oval
| 22,000
| 17 July 1948
|- bgcolor="#FFFFFF"
| 
| 12.12 (84)
| 
| 16.17 (113)
| Brunswick Street Oval
| 27,000
| 17 July 1948

Round 14

|- bgcolor="#CCCCFF"
| Home team
| Home team score
| Away team
| Away team score
| Venue
| Crowd
| Date
|- bgcolor="#FFFFFF"
| 
| 21.20 (146)
| 
| 5.9 (39)
| Punt Road Oval
| 11,000
| 24 July 1948
|- bgcolor="#FFFFFF"
| 
| 11.11 (77)
| 
| 17.11 (113)
| Brunswick Street Oval
| 17,500
| 24 July 1948
|- bgcolor="#FFFFFF"
| 
| 12.13 (85)
| 
| 16.11 (107)
| Victoria Park
| 35,000
| 24 July 1948
|- bgcolor="#FFFFFF"
| 
| 24.9 (153)
| 
| 9.8 (62)
| Princes Park
| 17,500
| 24 July 1948
|- bgcolor="#FFFFFF"
| 
| 14.18 (102)
| 
| 15.14 (104)
| Lake Oval
| 12,000
| 24 July 1948
|- bgcolor="#FFFFFF"
| 
| 11.7 (73)
| 
| 11.12 (78)
| Glenferrie Oval
| 8,000
| 24 July 1948

Round 15

|- bgcolor="#CCCCFF"
| Home team
| Home team score
| Away team
| Away team score
| Venue
| Crowd
| Date
|- bgcolor="#FFFFFF"
| 
| 11.18 (84)
| 
| 8.9 (57)
| Arden Street Oval
| 9,000
| 31 July 1948
|- bgcolor="#FFFFFF"
| 
| 11.6 (72)
| 
| 9.10 (64)
| Junction Oval
| 12,000
| 31 July 1948
|- bgcolor="#FFFFFF"
| 
| 10.18 (78)
| 
| 10.13 (73)
| Kardinia Park
| 19,000
| 31 July 1948
|- bgcolor="#FFFFFF"
| 
| 6.8 (44)
| 
| 15.16 (106)
| MCG
| 41,000
| 7 August 1948
|- bgcolor="#FFFFFF"
| 
| 11.21 (87)
| 
| 8.11 (59)
| Windy Hill
| 14,000
| 7 August 1948
|- bgcolor="#FFFFFF"
| 
| 4.17 (41)
| 
| 15.19 (109)
| Western Oval
| 17,500
| 7 August 1948

Round 16

|- bgcolor="#CCCCFF"
| Home team
| Home team score
| Away team
| Away team score
| Venue
| Crowd
| Date
|- bgcolor="#FFFFFF"
| 
| 11.25 (91)
| 
| 7.15 (57)
| Western Oval
| 8,000
| 14 August 1948
|- bgcolor="#FFFFFF"
| 
| 10.20 (80)
| 
| 10.10 (70)
| Princes Park
| 31,000
| 14 August 1948
|- bgcolor="#FFFFFF"
| 
| 5.11 (41)
| 
| 5.9 (39)
| Lake Oval
| 5,500
| 14 August 1948
|- bgcolor="#FFFFFF"
| 
| 5.12 (42)
| 
| 10.14 (74)
| Arden Street Oval
| 6,000
| 14 August 1948
|- bgcolor="#FFFFFF"
| 
| 6.7 (43)
| 
| 4.16 (40)
| Glenferrie Oval
| 8,500
| 14 August 1948
|- bgcolor="#FFFFFF"
| 
| 8.7 (55)
| 
| 8.10 (58)
| Punt Road Oval
| 29,000
| 14 August 1948

Round 17

|- bgcolor="#CCCCFF"
| Home team
| Home team score
| Away team
| Away team score
| Venue
| Crowd
| Date
|- bgcolor="#FFFFFF"
| 
| 15.13 (103)
| 
| 7.12 (54)
| MCG
| 13,500
| 21 August 1948
|- bgcolor="#FFFFFF"
| 
| 11.14 (80)
| 
| 11.15 (81)
| Kardinia Park
| 10,000
| 21 August 1948
|- bgcolor="#FFFFFF"
| 
| 9.9 (63)
| 
| 11.15 (81)
| Brunswick Street Oval
| 12,000
| 21 August 1948
|- bgcolor="#FFFFFF"
| 
| 15.18 (108)
| 
| 10.12 (72)
| Victoria Park
| 28,000
| 21 August 1948
|- bgcolor="#FFFFFF"
| 
| 8.10 (58)
| 
| 7.19 (61)
| Junction Oval
| 5,000
| 21 August 1948
|- bgcolor="#FFFFFF"
| 
| 16.15 (111)
| 
| 11.11 (77)
| Windy Hill
| 28,000
| 21 August 1948

Round 18

|- bgcolor="#CCCCFF"
| Home team
| Home team score
| Away team
| Away team score
| Venue
| Crowd
| Date
|- bgcolor="#FFFFFF"
| 
| 15.19 (109)
| 
| 11.4 (70)
| Victoria Park
| 11,000
| 28 August 1948
|- bgcolor="#FFFFFF"
| 
| 13.14 (92)
| 
| 15.11 (101)
| Princes Park
| 27,000
| 28 August 1948
|- bgcolor="#FFFFFF"
| 
| 17.11 (113)
| 
| 9.6 (60)
| Punt Road Oval
| 16,000
| 28 August 1948
|- bgcolor="#FFFFFF"
| 
| 7.7 (49)
| 
| 14.16 (100)
| Lake Oval
| 10,500
| 28 August 1948
|- bgcolor="#FFFFFF"
| 
| 8.12 (60)
| 
| 6.10 (46)
| Arden Street Oval
| 8,000
| 28 August 1948
|- bgcolor="#FFFFFF"
| 
| 9.10 (64)
| 
| 10.12 (72)
| Kardinia Park
| 18,500
| 28 August 1948

Round 19

|- bgcolor="#CCCCFF"
| Home team
| Home team score
| Away team
| Away team score
| Venue
| Crowd
| Date
|- bgcolor="#FFFFFF"
| 
| 7.12 (54)
| 
| 9.13 (67)
| Glenferrie Oval
| 5,000
| 4 September 1948
|- bgcolor="#FFFFFF"
| 
| 18.21 (129)
| 
| 11.10 (76)
| Western Oval
| 12,000
| 4 September 1948
|- bgcolor="#FFFFFF"
| 
| 10.11 (71)
| 
| 7.11 (53)
| Windy Hill
| 14,000
| 4 September 1948
|- bgcolor="#FFFFFF"
| 
| 9.21 (75)
| 
| 9.16 (70)
| Princes Park
| 24,000
| 4 September 1948
|- bgcolor="#FFFFFF"
| 
| 21.15 (141)
| 
| 6.9 (45)
| Lake Oval
| 8,000
| 4 September 1948
|- bgcolor="#FFFFFF"
| 
| 13.11 (89)
| 
| 8.11 (59)
| MCG
| 42,500
| 4 September 1948

Ladder

Finals

First Semi-Final

Second Semi-Final

Preliminary Final

Grand final

The 1948 Grand Final between Melbourne and Essendon, held at the Melbourne Cricket Ground on 2 October 1948, was a drawn match: Melbourne 10.9 (69) to Essendon 7.27 (69). The crowd was 86,198. The two teams played again a week later. (For an explanation of scoring see Australian rules football).

Grand Final Replay
Melbourne defeated Essendon 13.11 (89) to Essendon 7.8 (50), in the Grand Final Replay that was held at the Melbourne Cricket Ground on 9 October 1948, in front of 52,226 people. (For an explanation of scoring see Australian rules football).

Awards
 The 1948 VFL Premiership team was Melbourne.
 The VFL's leading goalkicker was Lindsay White of Geelong 86 goals.
 The winner of the 1948 Brownlow Medal was Bill Morris of Richmond with 24 votes.
 St Kilda took the "wooden spoon" in 1948.
Geelong 17.12 (114) defeated  12.9 (81) in the Grand Final, played as a curtain-raiser to the drawn senior Grand Final on Saturday 2 October at the Melbourne Cricket Ground.

Notable events
 All VFL matches were now scheduled to start at 2:15pm; previously it had been 2:30pm.
 In round 7, Melbourne champion Norm Smith played his two hundredth game. He was reported for abusing the umpire; despite his claim that he had only said "don't be silly", he was suspended for four weeks.
 After Carlton's round 11 loss at home to North Melbourne, police drew their batons to protect the umpires from Carlton fans.
 In the round 16 match between Footscray and Geelong at the Western Oval the north wind was so fierce that when the Geelong full-back Bruce Morrison kicked the ball off after Footscray had scored a behind, the ball floated back over his head and went through the goal; the Goal umpire signalled a "forced behind". Only 1.1 (7) of the game's combined score of 18.40 (148) was scored against the wind.
 The 1948 Grand Final was the first drawn Grand Final in VFL history. The second was the 1977 VFL Grand Final, and the third was the 2010 AFL Grand Final.

See also
 1948 VFL Grand Final

References

 Hogan, P., The Tigers of Old, The Richmond Football Club, (Richmond), 1996. 
 Maplestone, M., Flying Higher: History of the Essendon Football Club 1872–1996, Essendon Football Club, (Melbourne), 1996. 
 Rogers, S. & Brown, A., Every Game Ever Played: VFL/AFL Results 1897–1997 (Sixth Edition), Viking Books, (Ringwood), 1998. 
 Ross, J. (ed), 100 Years of Australian Football 1897–1996: The Complete Story of the AFL, All the Big Stories, All the Great Pictures, All the Champions, Every AFL Season Reported, Viking, (Ringwood), 1996.

External links
 1948 Season – AFL Tables

Australian Football League seasons
Vfl season